The 1994 World Ringette Championships (1994 WRC) was an international ringette tournament and the 3rd (III) World Ringette Championships, and was the first tournament organized by the International Ringette Federation (IRF) which had previously been called the "World Ringette Council". The tournament was contested in the city of Saint Paul, Minnesota, in the United States, between March 19 and 27, 1994, at the Rosemount Community Center/Arena in South St. Paul.

Overview
WRC 1994 was hosted in Minnesota, USA. In the previous World Championship, the 1992 World Ringette Championship, there were two Canadian teams competing, and in 1994 Canada sent two separate teams to compete for Canada once again.

Also present were national ringette teams from other countries: Team Finland, Team USA, Team Sweden, and Team Russia. Finland won the World Cup, its very first world championship. WRC 1994 marked the first time Finland broke into the medal standings since Team Canada began dominating the competition in 1990.

Finland defeated Team Canada East 4-2 in the final with Finland's Kristiina Vidlund scoring three goals. Finland's team leader was Eva Valtanen and the Captain was Satu Himberg. The team was coached by Jussi Voutilainen.

Venue
The tournament was contested in the city of Saint Paul, Minnesota, in the United States at the Rosemount Community Center/Arena in South St. Paul.

Teams

Final standings

Rosters

Team Finland

Team Canada
Two teams represented Canada at the 1994 World Ringette Championships: Team Canada East, and Team Canada West. Clémence Duchesneau, a member of 1994 Team Canada East, was named the tournament's top goalie.

Team Canada East
The 1994 Team Canada East team included the following:

Team Canada West
The 1994 Team Canada West team included the following:

See also
 World Ringette Championships
 International Ringette Federation
  Canada national ringette team
  Finland national ringette team
  Sweden national ringette team
  United States national ringette team

References

World Ringette Championships
Ringette
Ringette competitions